This is a list of protests in South Dakota related to the murder of George Floyd.

Locations

Aberdeen 
On June 1, on both sides of Sixth Avenue Southeast, over 50 protesters gathered to protest the murder of George Floyd.

Brookings 
Hundreds of people marched on June 5, 2020 in a demonstration to support Justice for Black Lives. The protest travelled throughout various government buildings downtown, including the courthouse, post office, and police department. The Brookings Police were supportive and closed intersections for the demonstration.

Huron 
On June 10, over 100 vehicles took part in a "Drive for George Floyd," parading through the streets of Huron with slogans supporting Floyd and Black Lives Matter.

Mitchell 
On June 3, 2020, a crowd of peaceful demonstrators marched through downtown Mitchell in solidarity of social justice change for the African American community.

Pierre 
On June 1, a group of protesters peacefully demonstrated outside the South Dakota State Capitol for approximately five hours.

Pine Ridge 
A small group, including two law enforcement officials, joined together for a protest on June 4, 2020.

Rapid City 
George Floyd's uncle Selwyn Jones spoke at an event held at Memorial Park on May 29. He said his nephew was "always smiling and laughing.” The rally ended with a performance by Native American musicians. The Chief of Police expressed regrets that he could not attend the memorial. On June 3, a small group protestors gathered in Rapid City, waving flags and holding signs in support of Black Lives Matter and George Floyd.

Sioux Falls 
A protest march was held in downtown Sioux Falls on May 31, ending outside the Sioux Falls and Minnehaha County Law Enforcement Center. George Floyd's uncle thanked the protestors for honoring his nephew. The event organizers for the downtown event emphasized nonviolence to honor Floyd. However, some rioters later traveled to Sioux Empire Mall, where they threw rocks through windows. Some protestors asked the rock throwers to stop and even formed a line in front of the police to quell the actions against police, but without success. Gov. Kristi Noem declared a state of emergency, from 10pm on May 31, to 7am on June 1. Seventy members of the National Guard were activated. SWAT and National Guard teams then assisted in enforcing curfew, but rioting and looting continued at the mall and other nearby stores.

Watertown 
On June 6, around 300 protesters peacefully marched from Diamondball Park to the Codington County Courthouse to support Black Lives Matter and George Floyd.

References 

South Dakota
2020 in South Dakota
Events in South Dakota
Riots and civil disorder in South Dakota
May 2020 events in the United States
June 2020 events in the United States